Granier de Cassagnac is the name of:
 Adolphe Granier de Cassagnac (1806–1880), French journalist
 His son Paul Adolphe Marie Prosper Granier de Cassagnac (1843–1904), French journalist and politician
 Raphaël Granier de Cassagnac (1973–), French physicist and writer